Airdrie Central is one of the twenty-one wards used to elect members of the North Lanarkshire Council. It currently elects four councillors and, as its name suggests, covers central and western parts of Airdrie (including Cairnhill, Coatdyke, Gartlea, Rawyards and Whinhall neighbourhoods). Established in 2007 returning three councillors, a boundary review in 2017 resulted in a very minor change (the addition of a few streets in Burnfoot) and slight population increase, but this was assessed to be sufficient for a fourth seat. The ward had a population of 16,354 in 2019.

Councillors

Election Results

2022 Election

2017 Election

2012 Election

2007 Election

References

Wards of North Lanarkshire
Airdrie, North Lanarkshire